Novitsky (masculine) or Novitskaya (feminine) is a surname of Slavic origin. It may refer to:

Craig Novitsky (born 1971), American football player
Edward Novitski (1918–2006), American geneticist
Evgeny Novitsky (born 1957), Russian hi-tech entrepreneur, former President of AFK Sistema
Gennady Novitsky (born 1949), former Prime Minister of Belarus
Vasily Fedorovich Novitsky, Russian general
Jeff Novitzky (born 1967), Food and Drug Administration agent
Oleg Novitsky, Russian cosmonaut
Pavel Novitsky (disambiguation)
Sergei Novitski (born 1981), Russian ice dancer

See also
 Nowicki
Nowitzki (surname)

Russian-language surnames